Heriberto Cruz (born 22 March 1939 in Guanica, Puerto Rico) is a Puerto Rican former hurdler who competed in the 1964 Summer Olympics.

References

1939 births
Living people
Puerto Rican male hurdlers
Olympic track and field athletes of Puerto Rico
Athletes (track and field) at the 1959 Pan American Games
Athletes (track and field) at the 1963 Pan American Games
Athletes (track and field) at the 1964 Summer Olympics
Central American and Caribbean Games gold medalists for Puerto Rico
Competitors at the 1966 Central American and Caribbean Games
Central American and Caribbean Games medalists in athletics
Pan American Games competitors for Puerto Rico
People from Guánica, Puerto Rico